Gregory Alan Flener (born February 25, 1969) is an American former professional baseball pitcher. He played parts of three seasons with the Toronto Blue Jays of Major League Baseball (MLB)

Career
Flener attended Armijo High School (Fairfield, California), then spent three years at California State University, Fullerton pursuing a business major. During those three seasons, Flener had a record of 21-3 as a starting pitcher. After the 1989 season, he played collegiate summer baseball with the Chatham A's of the Cape Cod Baseball League and was named a league all-star. He left school before completing his degree when the Toronto Blue Jays selected him in the ninth round of the 1990 MLB Draft.

Flener played for the Blue Jays in 1993, 1996, and 1997. Though the Blue Jays won the World Series in 1993 and Flener was awarded a World Series ring, he did not play in any post-season games and was not on the playoff roster. Flener continued playing minor league baseball until January 2001, when he lost his right eye after being struck by a batted ball while pitching in the Venezuelan Professional Baseball League.

References

External links
, or Retrosheet, or Venezuelan Winter League

1969 births
Living people
Akron Aeros players
American expatriate baseball players in Canada
Baseball players from Austin, Texas
Buffalo Bisons (minor league) players
Cal State Fullerton Titans baseball players
Cardenales de Lara players
Caribes de Oriente players
Chatham Anglers players
Dunedin Blue Jays players
Knoxville Smokies players
Major League Baseball pitchers
Mobile BayBears players
Myrtle Beach Hurricanes players
Navegantes del Magallanes players
American expatriate baseball players in Venezuela
People from Fairfield, California
St. Catharines Blue Jays players
Syracuse Chiefs players
Syracuse SkyChiefs players
Tacoma Rainiers players
Toronto Blue Jays players